Georg Pictorius of Villingen (c. 1500 – 1569) was a physician and an author of the German Renaissance.

He became active as a physician from 1540 in Ensisheim. In his book on magic, he condemns witchcraft, endorsing the witch-trials of his time: "if the witches are not burned, the number of these furies swells up in such an immense sea that no one could live safe from their spells and charms." (Midelfort p. 59) 
His gynecological Frauenzimmer gives cosmetic advice for women, from the suppression of unpleasant scents to the shaping of their bosom (Walter, p. 372f.)

works:
1532 Theologia mythologica
Isagoge, the fourth book in the collection published as the Fourth Book of Occult Philosophy by Henry Cornelius Agrippa
1555  Lasz Büchlin, on bloodletting
1560  Baderbüchlin, on balneotherapy
Von den Gattungen der Ceremonialmagie (Goetie) (Eng. Of the Kinds of Ceremonial Magic (Goetia)), ed. Das Kloster (1846)

See also
Johann Weyer

References
Tillmann Wertz, Georgius Pictorius (1500-1569/73). Leben und Werk eines oberrheinischen Arztes und Humanisten. Heidelberg: Palatina Verlag 2006. 
Midelfort, H. C. Erik, Witch Hunting in Southwestern Germany, 1562-1684: The Social and Intellectual Foundations (1972), .
Tilmann Walter, Unkeuschheit und Werk der Liebe: Diskurse über Sexualität am Beginn der Neuzeit in Deutschland  (1998), .
Rachel Darmon : "Georgius Pictorius à la recherche d'un langage mythographique", in Acta Conventus Neo-latini Uppsaliensis. Proceedings of the Fourteenth International Congress of Neo-latin Studies, Uppsala, 2009, dir. Astrid Steiner-Weber, Brill, 2012, p. 341-351.
Rachel Darmon : « La mythographie comme écriture de la variatio : métamorphoses poétiques de l’unité divine au XVIe siècle », in La variatio. L’aventure d’un principe d’écriture, de l’Antiquité au XXIe siècle. Actes du colloque tenu à l’Université de Clermont-Ferrand, 25-27 mars 2010, dir. Hélène Vial, Paris, Classiques Garnier, 2014, p. 429-439.
Rachel Darmon : « Figuration, fable et théologie dans les traités de mythographie », in Fable/ Figure. Récit, fiction, allégorisation à la Renaissance, dir. Trung Tran, RHR : Revue de l’association d’études sur la Renaissance, l’Humanisme et la Réforme, n° 77, Lyon, décembre 2013, p. 31-50.

1500s births
1569 deaths
German gynaecologists
German male writers
Occult writers
Witch hunters
Witchcraft in Germany